The Massachusetts Anti-Slavery Society, headquartered in Boston, was organized as an auxiliary of the American Anti-Slavery Society in 1835. Its roots were in the New England Anti-Slavery Society, organized by William Lloyd Garrison, editor of The Liberator, in 1831, after the defeat of a proposal for a college for blacks in New Haven.

Predecessors

New England Anti-Slavery Society 

The New England Anti-Slavery Society (1831–1837) was formed by William Lloyd Garrison, editor of The Liberator, in 1831. The Liberator was also its official publication.

Based in Boston, Massachusetts, members of the New England Anti-slavery Society supported immediate abolition and viewed slavery as immoral and non-Christian.  It was particularly opposed to the American Colonization Society, which proposed sending African Americans to Africa.

The founding meeting took place on January 1, 1831, in the vestry of the Belknap Street Church. (Some sources list the date as January 1, 1832.) Garrison was the principal founder. The other founding members were: Benjamin Bierly of Amesbury, Massachusetts, Reverend Elijah Blanchard, Dr. Gamaliel Bradford, Elizabeth B. Chase, Joshua Easton, also a member of the Massachusetts General Colored Association, Charles Theodore Follen, Reverend Henry Grew, Reverend Cyrus Pitt Grosvenor, Ellis Gray Loring, Captain Jonas Parker of Reading, Massachusetts, Reverend Perry of Mendon, Massachusetts, Reverend Amos August Phelps, Reverend Aaron Pickett of Reading, Massachusetts, Samuel Edmund Sewall, Horace Wakefield, Amasa Walker, and a Reverend Yates.

The Society sponsored lecturers or "agents" who traveled throughout the New England area, speaking in local churches or halls, and also selling abolitionist tracts or The Liberator. Whenever possible, the Society's agents would also encourage the formation of local anti-slavery societies. By 1833 there were 47 local societies in ten northern states, 33 of them in New England. The Society also sponsored mass mobilizations such as yearly anti-slavery conventions and celebrations of July 4 or — preferred by those who believed celebrating July 4 was unacceptable since the U.S. Constitution accepted slavery — the Anniversary of the Abolition of Slavery in the West Indies, August 1.

New England Anti-Slavery Society: Proceedings of the Fourth New England Anti-Slavery Convention held in Boston, May 30, 31 and June 1 and 2, 1837. Boston: Isaac Knapp. 1837. 
 
"And what is Texas, that she should form a part of the great family of nations? If there ever was a band of robbers, they live in Texas. Who are their chief officers, their great men? The President of Texas is an outlaw in his own native State, Tennessee. The Speaker of their House of Representatives is a convicted felon, in the state of New-York."

John Levy (black abolitionist), "a colored gentleman" from Lowell, decries insufficient involvement of free Negroes in the struggle. Garrison, Birney, Burleigh, Henry Stanton, and other stalwarts speak at length.

Massachusetts General Colored Association 
In January 1833, Thomas Dalton, president of the Massachusetts General Colored Association, led a successful petition to merge with the New England Anti-Slavery Society. Separate black anti-slavery societies had already existed in Massachusetts, New York, Ohio, Connecticut, and New Jersey, however, a strong feeling against the organization of separate anti-slavery societies had been emerging.

Together they organized Anti-Slavery conventions and speaking programs throughout New England.

Sometime after Joshua Easton was sent as a delegate to the New England society in 1833, African Americans were granted full membership in the organization.

American Anti-Slavery Society 
In 1833, Garrison and Arthur Tappan expanded this society and formed the American Anti-Slavery Society. The American Anti-Slavery Society, however, attempted to create state-based organizations under the umbrella of its Executive Committee. At first the New England Anti-Slavery Society and the American Society worked together, with the New England Society becoming an auxiliary in 1834.

History

In 1838, however, the New England Society gave up its regional jurisdiction and reorganized into the Massachusetts Anti-Slavery Society. The society took a proactive role in advocating for legislation against new slave codes and laws, particularly within Massachusetts, including publishing treatises related to proposals to outlaw or penalize those participating in the activities and formation of societies relating to abolition and anti-slavery activities

Annual meetings were held in Boston at Julien Hall, Melodeon, and Tremont Temple. Officers included James N. Buffum, Francis Jackson, Wendell Phillips, Parker Pillsbury, and Edmund Quincy. Lecturers affiliated with the society included   William Wells Brown, Frederick Douglass, Samuel Joseph May, and Charles Lenox Remond. Joel W. Lewis was the Chairman in 1840.

The New England Anti-Slavery Society held conventions in:
 Boston, Massachusetts, May 30, 31 and June 1 and 2, 1837

The Massachusetts Anti-Slavery Society held conventions in:
 Worcester, Massachusetts, October 1840
 Nantucket, Massachusetts, 1841

Following the Civil War the Massachusetts Anti-Slavery Society took up the cause of racial equality.

See also 
 Massachusetts General Colored Association, which joined the New England Anti-Slavery Society in 1833
 World Anti-Slavery Convention of 1840

References

Further reading

Issued by the society
 
 
 
 
 
<RARE BKS 4264.56 no. 24>

About the society

External links

 
  (Printed slogans "attributed to the Massachusetts Anti-Slavery Society, circa 1850")

1831 establishments in Massachusetts
19th century in Boston
African-American history of Massachusetts
American Anti-Slavery Society
Defunct American political movements
Organizations based in Boston
Pre-emancipation African-American history
William Lloyd Garrison